Bozen Green is a hamlet in Hertfordshire, England. It includes the lost settlement of Bordesden. It is in the civil parish of Braughing

Hamlets in Hertfordshire
Braughing